Tupapa Maraerenga Football Club is a Cook Islands football club located in Avarua, Cook Islands. It currently plays in the Cook Islands Round Cup and in the Cook Islands Cup.

History
Tupapa F.C. are the most successful club in the Cook Islands. They have won 16 Cook Islands Round Cup and 9 Cook Islands Cup. For the 2012–13 season after winning the national championship, the team will compete for third time in the 2012–13 OFC Champions League, starting in the Preliminary Round. They had participated in the years 2000–01 and in the 2008–09.

After winning the 2022 Tower Insurance Premiership they qualified for the 2023 OFC Champions League, but failed to qualify after losing to Lupe o le Soaga SC.

Titles
Cook Islands Round Cup: 17
1992, 1993, 1998–99, 2001, 2002, 2003, 2007, 2010, 2011, 2012, 2014, 2015, 2017, 2018, 2019, 2020, 2022
Cook Islands Cup: 10

1978, 1998–99, 1999–2000, 2001, 2004, 2009, 2013, 2015, 2018, 2019.

Current squad
Squad for the 2020 OFC Champions League Preliminary stage

Staff

References

Football clubs in the Cook Islands
Avarua